Izet Ibrahimi (born January 1, 1962) is a retired Albanian politician from Kosovo, and a former mayor of Glogovac. He is currently a lecturer.

Biography 
Izet Ibrahimi was born near Glogovac, Kosovo to Albanian parents. He finished high school in Prishtina in 1981, later attending the Faculty of Geoscience and Technology of the University of Prishtina, from which he graduated in 1986.

Ibrahimi graduated from the University of Pristina in 1986, he earned a degree in engineering. In 1995 he enrolled in postgraduate studies at FXM. He earned the title Master of Technical Sciences. Ibrahimi submitted a doctoral thesis in 2008 titled "Opportunities to bramces exploitation of Ferronickel for producing construction materials", defending it at the Faculty of Geoscience and Technology of University of Pristina and received the academic title of Doctor of Technical Sciences.

Ibrahimi has served as the chairman of the Independent Union of "Ferronikel", chairman of the Municipal Council for Finance, and political chairman of the KLA in the "Operative Zone" of Glogovac.

Following the adoption of UNSCR 1244, he co-founded the Democratic Party of Kosovo (PDK) in Glogovac. He was a member of the General Board for three terms. In the first democratic elections after the Kosovo War, he ran for Mayor of Glogovac, winning with an approval rate of over 90%.

After leaving the PDK, Ibrahimi founded the "Citizens Initiative for Glogovac", a political movement that opposed the misrule in Glogovac. Following his retirement from politics, he is now a lecturer at the UM at the Faculty of Geoscience and Metallurgy.

Ibrahimi is married to Hanumshahe Zogaj, a geoscience engineer, with whom he has three children: Qëndrim, Hekuran and Erëza.

References

1962 births
Living people
People from Drenas